The Cloughton Formation is a geologic formation in England. It preserves fossils dating back to the Jurassic period.

See also 
 List of fossiliferous stratigraphic units in England

References
 

Jurassic England
Bajocian Stage